Nancy Celis (born 9 October 1966) is a German volleyball player. She competed in the women's tournament at the 1996 Summer Olympics.

References

1966 births
Living people
German women's volleyball players
Olympic volleyball players of Germany
Volleyball players at the 1996 Summer Olympics
People from Lier, Belgium